Setoperone is a compound that is a ligand to the 5-HT2A receptor.
It can be radiolabeled with the radioisotope fluorine-18 and used as a radioligand with positron emission tomography (PET).
Several research studies have used the radiolabeled setoperone in neuroimaging  for the studying neuropsychiatric disorders, such as depression
or schizophrenia.

Synthesis

The starting material is called 6-(2-hydroxyethyl)-7-methyl-2,3-dihydro-[1,3]thiazolo[3,2-a]pyrimidin-5-one, CID:15586462 (1). Halogenation of this with hydrobromic acid in acetic acid gives CID:15586463 (2). Sn2 alkylation with 4-(4-fluorobenzoyl)piperidine [56346-57-7] (3) under Finkelstein reaction conditions affords setoperone (4).

See also
 Altanserin
 Ketanserin
 Pirenperone
 Ritanserin

References

5-HT2A antagonists
Abandoned drugs
Aromatic ketones
Fluoroarenes
Piperidines
Receptor modulators
Thiazolopyrimidines